Elisabetta Vandi (born 30 March 2000) is an Italian sprinter who won bronze medal with the Italian national track relay team at the 2019 IAAF World Relays.

Elisabetta is the younger sister of the middle-distance runner Eleonora Vandi.

National records
Under 20
 400 metres: 53.24 ( Tampere, 11 July 2018) - current holder.

Achievements
Youth

Senior

See also
 Italy at the World Athletics Relays
 Italy at the 2018 European Athletics Championships

Notes

References

External links
 

2000 births
Living people
Italian female sprinters
Sportspeople from the Province of Pesaro and Urbino
Athletics competitors of Fiamme Oro
People from Pesaro